Galina Mitrokhina may refer to
Galina Mitrokhina (rowing) (born 1940), Russian rower
Galina Mitrokhina (track athlete) (born 1944), Russian track and field athlete